Yann Annabelle Piat (née Marie; 12 June 1949 – 25 February 1994) was a French politician. She served in the National Assembly from 1986 to 1994, first with the extreme right party National Front, then with the centrist party Union for French Democracy. She was assassinated in 1994.

Early life
Yann Piat was born on June 12, 1949, in Saigon, French Indochina.

Career
Piat started her career as an activist for the National Front.

Piat later joined the Union for French Democracy. She served as a member of the National Assembly from 1993 to 1994. She was opposed to the expansion of the Toulon–Hyères Airport.

Death and legacy
She was gunned down by Lucien Ferri, while driving home in Hyères on February 25, 1994.

In 2008, the Rue Yann-Piat in Hyères was named in her honour.

In 2012, a TV film directed by Antoine de Caunes and starring Karin Viard as Piat, entitled Yann Piat, chronique d'un assassinat was released on Canal +.

References

1949 births
1994 deaths
People from Ho Chi Minh City
People of French Indochina
National Rally (France) politicians
Union for French Democracy politicians
Deputies of the 8th National Assembly of the French Fifth Republic
Deputies of the 9th National Assembly of the French Fifth Republic
Deputies of the 10th National Assembly of the French Fifth Republic
Assassinated French politicians